Mark L. Kligman (born 1962) is the Mickey Katz Chair Professor of Jewish Music at the Herb Alpert School of Music, University of California, Los Angeles, a Chair position which was endowed by Katz's family in 2014. and also a published author of 5 books, the highest of which is in 150 libraries. He is also a board member of the Association for Jewish Studies and is the editor of the association's journal, Musica Judaica. He also authored a chapter in The Oxford Handbook of Religion and the Arts.

Education and early career
He received his both Master of Arts and Ph.D. from New York University. After these degrees, he started as a professor at the Hebrew Union College-Jewish Institute of Religion.

References

1962 births
People from Santa Monica, California
Jewish American writers
Jewish educators
UCLA Herb Alpert School of Music faculty
Living people
New York University alumni
Hebrew Union College – Jewish Institute of Religion faculty